The Piano Sonata in E minor D 769A (formerly D. 994) is a piano sonata written by Franz Schubert.

Movements

Opening
The sonata is incomplete, consisting of only a single movement, and even that was abandoned by the composer before completion.

External links
 

Piano sonatas by Franz Schubert
Compositions in E minor